This article provides details of international football games played by the Republic of Ireland national football team from 2020 to present.

Results

2020

2021

2022

Forthcoming fixtures
The following matches are scheduled:

2023

Notes

References

2020-present)
Republic of Ireland national football team results
2020s in the Republic of Ireland
2020s in Irish sport